Lower Yangtze Mandarin is one of the most divergent and least mutually-intelligible of the Mandarin languages, as it neighbours the Wu, Hui, and Gan groups of Sinitic languages.  It is also known as Jiang–Huai Mandarin, named after the Yangtze (Jiang) and Huai Rivers.  Lower Yangtze is distinguished from most other Mandarin varieties by the retention of a final glottal stop in words that ended in a stop consonant in Middle Chinese.

During the Ming dynasty and early Qing dynasty, the lingua franca of administration was based on Lower Yangtze Mandarin. In the 19th century the base shifted to the Beijing dialect.

Geographic distribution 

Lower Yangtze Mandarin is spoken in central Anhui, eastern Hubei, most of Jiangsu north of the Yangtze, as well as the area around Nanjing.  The number of speakers was estimated in 1987 at 67 million.

Subgrouping
The Language Atlas of China divides Lower Yangtze Mandarin into three branches:

Hongchao dialects
The largest and most widespread branch, mostly concentrated in Jiangsu and Anhui provinces, with smaller areas in Zhejiang province. The best-known variety is Nanjing dialect.  Other cities in the area are Hefei in the west and Yangzhou, Zhenjiang and Yancheng in the east.
Tong-Tai / Tai–Ru
Mostly spoken in the eastern Jiangsu prefectures of Taizhou and Nantong (including Rugao).
Huang–Xiao
Mostly spoken in the prefectures of Huanggang and Xiaogan in eastern Hubei province and the area around Jiujiang in northern Jiangxi, with an island in western Hubei around Zhushan, and another in Anhui around Anqing.
There are also small islands of Jianghuai Mandarin (Jūnjiāhuà 軍家話) throughout Guangdong, Guangxi, Hainan and Fujian provinces, brought to these areas during the Ming dynasty by soldiers from Jiangsu, Anhui and Henan during the reign of Hongwu Emperor.

The Huizhou dialects, spoken in southern Anhui, share different features with Wu, Gan and Lower Yangtze Mandarin, making them difficult to classify.  Earlier scholars had assigned to them one or other of those groups or to a top-level group of their own. The Atlas adopted the latter position, but it remains controversial.

Relations to other groups 

The linguist Cheng evaluated the extent of relationship between dialects by using Pearson's correlation coefficients. The result was that Eastern dialects of Jianghuai "cluster", with the Xiang and Gan dialects when a 35-word list was used, and Northern and Southern Mandarin were nowhere in the cluster with Eastern Jianghuai Northern and Southern were supposedly "genetic" relatives of Jianghuai Mandarin.

Some Chinese linguists like Ting have claimed that Jianghuai is mostly Wu containing a superstratum of Mandarin.

The linguist Dan Xu suggested that Jianghuai Mandarin is an intermediary with Standard Mandarin and Wu regarding the occurrence of postpositions in Chinese.

When Jianghuai Mandarin and Wu were compared to dialects from China's southeastern coast, it was concluded "that chain-type shifts in Chinese follow the same general rules as have been revealed by Labov for American and British English dialects."

Some works of literature produced in Yangzhou, such as Qingfengzha, a novel, contain Jianghuai Mandarin. People in Yangzhou identified by the dialect they speak, locals spoke the dialect, as opposed to sojourners, who spoke Huizhou or Wu dialects. This led to the formation of identity based on dialect. Large numbers of merchants from Huizhou lived in Yangzhou and effectively were responsible for keeping the town afloat.

A professor of Chinese at Rutgers University, Richard Vanness Simmons, claims that the Hangzhou dialect, rather than being Wu as it was classified by Yuen Ren Chao, is a Mandarin dialect closely related to Jianghuai Mandarin. The Hangzhou dialect is still classified under Wu. Chao had developed a "Common Wu Syllabary" for the Wu dialects. Simmons claimed that, had Chao compared the Hangzhou dialect to the Wu syllabary and Jianghuai Mandarin, he would have found more similarities to Jianghuai.

Phonology 

A characteristic feature of Lower Yangtze Mandarin is the treatment of Middle Chinese syllable-final stops.  Middle Chinese syllables with vocalic or nasal codas had a three-way tonal contrast.  Syllables with stop codas (-p, -t and -k) had no phonemic tonal contrast, but were traditionally treated as comprising a fourth category, called the entering tone.  In modern Mandarin varieties, the former three-way contrast has been reorganized as four tones that are generally consistent across the group, though the pitch values of the tones vary considerably.  In most varieties, including the Beijing dialect on which Standard Chinese is based, the final stops have disappeared, and these syllables have been divided between the tones in different ways in different subgroups.  In Lower Yangtze Mandarin, however, the stop codas have merged as a glottal stop, but these syllables remain separate from the four tonal categories shared with other Mandarin varieties.  A similar development is also found in the adjacent Wu dialect group, and in the Jin group, which many linguists include within Mandarin.

Most other Mandarin varieties distinguish these initials. The Middle Chinese retroflex initials have merged with affricate initials in non-Mandarin varieties, and also in Southwest Mandarin and most Lower Yangtze varieties. However, the Nanjing dialect retains the distinction, like northern Mandarin varieties. Tai–Ru varieties retain a distinct  initial, but this has merged with the zero initial in other Mandarin varieties.

Literary and colloquial readings 

The existence of literary and colloquial readings is a notable feature of Lower Yangtze Mandarin.

History 

The original dialect of Nanjing was the Wu dialect in the Eastern Jin dynasty. After the Wu Hu uprising, the Jin Emperor and many northern Chinese fled south. The new capital of Eastern Jin was created at Jiankang, now Nanjing. The Nanjing dialect started to transform into Jianghuai Mandarin from Wu. Further events, such as Hou Jing's rebellions during the Liang dynasty and the Sui dynasty invasion of the Chen dynasty resulted in Jiankang's destruction. During the Ming dynasty, Ming Taizu relocated southerners from below Yangzi and made Nanjing the capital. During the Taiping Rebellion, Taiping rebels seized Nanjing and made it the capital of the Taiping Kingdom. The fighting resulted in the loss of the population of Nanjing. Those events all played in role in forming today's Nanjing dialect.

Immigrants from Northern China during the middle of the Song dynasty moved south, bringing a speech type from which Northern Wu and Jianghuai reading patterns both derive from. The northern immigrants almost totally replaced from the original inhabitants on the Yangtze's northern bank. Jiang-huai, like other dialects of Chinese, has two forms for pronouncing words, the Bai (common, vulgar), and the Wen (literary). The Bai forms appear to preserve more ancient forms of speech dating from before the mass migration in the Song dynasty, which brought in the Wen pronunciations.

Jianghuai Mandarin was possibly the native tone of the founding emperor of the Ming dynasty, Zhu Yuanzhang and many of his military and civil officials.

In the early Ming period, Wu speakers moved into the eastern Tong-Tai-speaking region, and Gan-speakers from Jiangxi moved into the western Huang–Xiao region, influencing the respective Jianghuai dialects.

In the Ming and Qing dynasties, Jianghuai-speakers moved into Hui dialect areas.

The Portuguese Chinese Dictionary (PCD), written by missionaries during the Ming dynasty, categorized several Jianghuai dialects with rounded finals. The eastern and southeastern variants of Jianghuai contain the rounded finals. The Nanjing dialect, on the other hand, is in another group.

Matteo Ricci's Dicionário Português-Chinês documented Ming dynasty Mandarin. A number of words appeared to be derived from Jianghuai Mandarin dialect, such as "pear, jujube, shirt, ax, hoe, joyful, to speak, to bargain, to know, to urinate, to build a house, busy, and not yet."

The "Guanhua koiné" of the early Ming era was based on Jianghuai Guanhua (Jianghuai Mandarin). Western missionaries and Korean Hangul writings of the Ming Guanhua and Nanjing dialect showed differences that pointed to the Guanhua being a koiné and mixture of various dialects, strongly based on Jianghuai.

Some linguists have studied the influence that Nanjing Jianghuai Mandarin had on Ming dynasty guanhua/Mandarin. Although the early Ming dynasty Mandarin/Guanhua was a koine based on the Nanjing dialect, it was not entirely identical, with some non-Jianghuai characteristics being found in it. Francisco Varo advised that to learn Chinese, one must acquire it from "Not just any Chinese, but only those who have the natural gift of speaking the Mandarin language well, such as those natives of the Province of Nan king, and of other provinces where the Mandarin tongue is spoken well."

Jianghuai Mandarin shares some characteristics with Ming dynasty Southern Mandarin.

Jianghuai Mandarin, along with Northern Mandarin, formed the standard for Baihua before and during the Qing dynasty until its replacement by Standard Mandarin. Baihua was used by writers all over China, regardless of the dialect spoken. Chinese writers who spoke other dialects had to use the grammar and the vocabulary of Jianghuai and Northern Mandarin for the majority of Chinese to understand their writing. By contrast, Chinese who did not speak southern dialects would not be able to understand southern dialects in writing.

Peking opera got its start in parts of Anhui and Hubei that spoke the dialect.

Jianghuai Mandarin is currently overtaking Wu as the language variety of multiple counties in Jiangsu. An example is Zaicheng Town, in Lishui County. Both Jianghuai and Wu were spoken in several towns in Lishui, with Wu being spoken by more people in more towns than Jianghuai. Wu is called "old Zaicheng Speech", and Jianghuai dialect is called "new Zaicheng speech", with Wu being driven rapidly to extinction. Only the elderly speak it to relatives. The Jianghuai dialect was present there for about a century even though all the surrounding areas around the town are Wu-speaking. Jianghuai was always confined to the town itself until the 1960s, but it is now overtaking Wu.

References

Works cited

Further reading
 
 

Mandarin Chinese